Raja Ali Haji bin Raja Haji Ahmad (1808/9–1869/75) was a 19th-century Bugis-Malay historian, poet and scholar who wrote Tuhfal al-Nafis. He was elevated to the status of National Hero of Indonesia in 2004. Haji has been described as one of the most important Malay writers of the 19th century.

Early life
Raja Ali Haji was born in Selangor (although some sources stated that he was born in Penyengat) in 1808 or 1809, and was the son of Raja Ahmad, who was titled Engku Haji Tua after accomplishing the pilgrimage to Mecca. He was the grandson of Raja Ali Haji Fisabilillah (the brother of Raja Lumu, the first Sultan of Selangor). Fisabilillah was a scion of the royal house of Riau, who were descended from Bugis warriors who came to the region in the 18th century. His mother, Encik Hamidah binti Malik was a cousin of her father and also of Bugis descent. Raji Ali Haji soon relocated to Penyengat as an infant, where he grew up and received his education.

Career 
He went on pilgrimage to Mecca in 1828 when he was 19 years old. Haji undertook a diverse education and he eventually became renowned for his learning. He was 32, Haji became a joint regent who helped administer Lingga for the young Sultan Mahmud Muzaffar Shah.

Death
Most sources stated that Raja Ali Haji died in 1872 at Penyengat Island in Riau, but the date of his death was being debated as scattered evidences surfaced to oppose this claim. Among the best-known evidences was a letter written in 1872 when Raja Ali Haji wrote a letter to Herman Von De Wall, a Dutch cultural expert, who later died at Tanjung Pinang in 1873.

Ancestry

Notable works

Poems
 1847: Syair Abdul Muluk (disputed)
 1847: Gurindam Dua Belas

Books
 1860s: Tuhfat al-Nafis (The Precious Gift)
 1865: Silsilah Melayu dan Bugis

Other writings
 1857: Bustan al-Kathibin
 1850s: Kitab Pengetahuan Bahasa (uncompleted)
 1857: Intizam Waza'if al-Malik
 1857: Thamarat al-Mahammah

References

External links

 Tribute website to Raja Ali Haji
  Raja Ali Haji, in Malay world

1808 births
1873 deaths
People from Selangor
Indonesian people of Malay descent
Indonesian male poets
Indonesian writers
Royal House of Selangor
Bugis people
19th-century Indonesian poets
Linguists of Malay
National Heroes of Indonesia